Diaspidinae is the largest subfamily of armored scale insects, with 252 genera.

References

 
Diaspididae
Hemiptera subfamilies